There are 39 currencies currently in official use in the Americas. All de jure present currencies in the Americas are listed here, including currencies from countries which are not sovereign states or dependencies.

A commonly used currency in the Americas is the United States dollar. It is the world's largest reserve currency, the resulting economic value of which benefits the U.S. at over $100 billion annually. However, its position as a reserve currency damages American exporters because this increases the value of the United States dollar. The United States dollar is also "standard" in international commodity markets. In the phenomenon known as 'dollarization', the U.S. dollar has been adopted as the official currency of several other countries. However, semi-dollarization also exists in a few other countries where the U.S. dollar is recognised as legal tender alongside another currency, and unofficial dollarization exists in many areas where the U.S. dollar is widely used and accepted-although it is not recognised as legal tender. Ecuador uses the United States dollar (the French overseas department French Guiana uses the euro, the currency of France).

The Brazilian real is considered a strong South American currency; under presidents Luiz Inácio Lula da Silva and Dilma Rousseff, the real almost tripled in value, resulting in a vast change in economics, with many people who were middle class benefiting greatly. The minimum wage was raised, and Brazil's position as a leading exporter of raw materials, including soya beans and iron ore was underlined, but they are responsible for Brazil's improved economy, which damaged the "competitiveness of manufacturing", reducing the amount of exports.

The Chilean currency, the Chilean peso, is also strong. However, this again means that manufacturing struggles, as cheaper imports are pricing them out of business. In January 2011, after Chile announced that in 2011 the country planned to buy foreign reserves of $12 billion, the peso experienced an immediate fall in value. The country's main export is copper to China and India. The currency strength has resulted in over-high wages, and high inflation.

The East Caribbean dollar is the most used currency by the number of countries in the Caribbean utilizing it. The East Caribbean dollar is pegged to the United States dollar, and has been for over 35 years since 1976, having previously been pegged to the pound sterling. In 1965, the East Caribbean Currency Authority was established (coming after the British Caribbean Currency Board), to distribute currency, but The Bahamas withdrew from the organisation to create its own bank. The East Caribbean dollar is used in all seven member countries of the Organisation of Eastern Caribbean States (OECS) and Anguilla (a British overseas territory); the only OECS member using a different currency is the British Virgin Islands, a British overseas territory where the U.S. dollar is the official currency. Cuba and Panama both use two currencies. Cuba is attempting to gradually phase out the Cuban convertible peso, unifying the two in the Cuban peso. Although there is no confirmed timescale for the reform, whilst quoting Cuban economists, Reuters gave an estimation of 18 months (from October 2013). Panama uses the United States dollar informally, but additionally uses the Panamanian balboa as legal tender.

American sovereign state currencies

See also 
 List of circulating currencies

Notes

References 

Americas